The 2019–20 HNK Gorica season was the club's 11th season in existence and the 2nd consecutive season in the top flight of Croatian football.

First-team squad

Transfers

In

Source: Glasilo Hrvatskog nogometnog saveza

Out

Source: Glasilo Hrvatskog nogometnog saveza

Total spending:  0 €

Total income:  2,250,000 €

Total expenditure:  2,250,000 €

Competitions

Overview

HT Prva liga

League table

Results summary

Results by round

Matches

Source: Croatian Football Federation

Croatian Football Cup

Source: Croatian Football Federation

Player seasonal records
Updated 5 June 2021

Goals

Source: Competitive matches

Clean sheets

Source: Competitive matches

Disciplinary record

Appearances and goals

Notes

References

External links

HNK Gorica seasons
Gorica